Miguel Ángel de la Campa y Caraveda (8 December 1882 – 19 August 1965) was a Cuban diplomat, lawyer and author.

Campa was the son of Spaniards Miguel Angel de la Campa-Alvarodiaz and Maria Teresa Caraveda.
He graduated from the Colegio de Belen in 1900 and later the University of Havana School of Law.

He served in the Cuban diplomatic corps from 1906 to 1958. He served as the Cuban Ambassador to Spain, Italy, Mexico, Japan, the United Nations.  He was the Cuban Foreign Minister twice, first from 1937 to 1940, and then from 1952 to 1955.  He additionally served as the Cuban Attorney General and as its Minister of Defense. His last post was as the Cuban Ambassador to the United States (1955–1958) and resigned when Fulgencio Batista was overthrown by Fidel Castro. He received decorations from over 35 countries, such as the Legion of Honor from France and the Order of Isabella the Catholic from Spain.

He was married to Maria Teresa Roff (died 7 December 1952) on 12 December, 1907 at the Church of St. Honorato in Paris, France and they had five children Maria Teresa (1917-) (married first to Guillermo de Zendegui and then to Luis Andres Vargas Gomez), Miguelina (1919-) (married to Octavio A. Averhoff), Berta (1911–1999), Miguel Ángel (1922–1984), and Alberto de la Campa y Roff (1918–1964). They lived at Calle 27 #557 in Vedado, Havana, Cuba.

References

 The Miami News; Campa, Ex Cuban Ambassador; 21 August 1965; Page 14A.
 The New York Times; Miguel Angel Campa, 83; Ex-Cuban Envoy and Minister; 23 August 1965, Page 31.
  (Spanish)

Cuban diplomats
Foreign ministers of Cuba
Ambassadors of Cuba to the United States
1882 births
1965 deaths
People from Havana
Recipients of the Legion of Honour
Ambassadors of Cuba to Spain
Ambassadors of Cuba to Italy
Ambassadors of Cuba to Mexico
Recipients of the Order of Isabella the Catholic
Permanent Representatives of Cuba to the United Nations
1930s in Cuba
1940s in Cuba
1950s in Cuba
20th-century Cuban lawyers
20th-century Cuban politicians